Hemtabad is a village in Hemtabad CD block in Raiganj subdivision of Uttar Dinajpur district in the state of West Bengal, India.

Geography

Location

In the map alongside, all places marked on the map are linked in the full screen version.

Police station
Hemtabad police station under West Bengal police has jurisdiction over Hemtabad CD block. It is 8 km from the district headquarters and covers an area of 191.6 km2.

CD block HQ
The headquarters of Hemtabad CD block is at Hemtabad village.

Demographics
As per the 2011 Census of India, Hemtabad had a total population of 3,810, of which 1,941 (51%) were males and 1,869 (49%) were females. Population below 6 years was 445. The total number of literates in Hemtabad was 2,742 (81.49% of the population over 6 years)

Transport
State Highway No. 10A, running from Buniadpur to Raiganj passes through Hemtabad.

Healthcare
Hemtabad rural hospital at Hemtabad (with 30 beds) is the main medical facility in Hemtabad CD block.

References

Villages in Uttar Dinajpur district